The R589 road is a regional road in Ireland which links Waterford in County Waterford, and Slieverue in County Kilkenny. 

See also 

 Roads in Ireland
 National primary road
 National secondary road

References 

Regional roads in the Republic of Ireland
Roads in County Cork

Roads in County Waterford